Norman Oakley (4 June 1939 – 29 November 2016) was an English professional footballer who played for Firth Moor, Wingate Welfare Juniors, Doncaster Rovers, Scunthorpe United, Hartlepool United, Swindon Town, Grimsby Town and Boston United, as a goalkeeper.

References

1939 births
2016 deaths
English footballers
Doncaster Rovers F.C. players
Scunthorpe United F.C. players
Hartlepool United F.C. players
Swindon Town F.C. players
Grimsby Town F.C. players
Boston United F.C. players
English Football League players
Association football goalkeepers
English football managers